Kristoffer Eikrem (born 6 June 1989 in Molde, Norway) is a Norwegian jazz musician (trumpet), composer and photographer, based in Oslo, Norway.

Career 
Eikrem holds a bachelor's degree in jazz performance from the Norwegian Academy of Music (2010). He has been recognized as trumpeter with Pixel, and won the 2016 Jazzstipendiat at Moldejazz. During the 2016 festival in Molde he got on stage with his own quartet and featured the American cool jazz saxophonist Jimmy Halperin.

Honors 
2015: Recipient of the Jazz stipend awarded by Shell at Moldejazz

Discography 

With Kjetil Jerve
2014: Feeling // Emotion (NorCD)

With Fredfades
2015: Jazz Cats (KingUnderground Records)

With Mopti
2013: Logic (Ocean Sound Recordings)
2015 in music|2015: Bits & Pieces (Jazzland Recordings)

References

External links 

1989 births
Norwegian Academy of Music alumni
Jazzland Recordings (1997) artists
Living people
Musicians from Oslo
Norwegian jazz composers
Male jazz composers
Norwegian jazz trumpeters
Male trumpeters
21st-century Norwegian trumpeters
21st-century Norwegian male musicians
Mopti (band) members
NorCD artists